The Green Goddess is the colloquial name for the RLHZ Self Propelled Pump manufactured by Bedford Vehicles, a fire engine used originally by the Auxiliary Fire Service (AFS), and latterly held in reserve by the Home Office until 2004, and available when required to deal with exceptional events, including being operated by the British Armed Forces during fire-fighters’ strikes (1977 and 2002). These green-painted vehicles were built between 1953 and 1956 for the AFS. The design was based on a Bedford RL series British military truck.

Auxiliary Fire Service
The Auxiliary Fire Service was established as part of civil defence preparations after World War II, and subsequent events such as the Soviet Union detonating an atomic bomb made their presence supporting civilians as part of Britain's civil defence an important role. It was thought that a nuclear attack on Britain would cause a large number of fires, which would overwhelm the ordinary fire service, so a large stock of basic fire engines was ordered to form a reserve capacity. They were in continuous use by the AFS, until disbandment in 1968 by the Harold Wilson Government.

The Green Goddess machines were not primarily fire engines (AFS members referred to them as "appliances"); they are more correctly titled "self-propelled pumps", with some being two-wheel drive (4×2), and others in four-wheel drive (4×4) form. Their main role was to pump huge quantities of water from lakes, rivers, canals and other sources into cities hit by a nuclear attack. The machines could be used in a relay system over a number of miles, with Green Goddesses at regular intervals to boost the water pressure. Firefighting was a secondary role.

Operational use

Prior to disbandment, the AFS used the Green Goddess extensively in support of the local fire services throughout the UK. They provided additional water delivery and firefighting capability at times when the regular fire brigades had a major incident to contain. The ability to relay large quantities of water over considerable distances was invaluable in some more remote locations, or where the incident required more water than local water systems could provide. Most UK boroughs had an Auxiliary Fire Service detachment housed alongside the regular brigade equipment. 

After 1968, the vehicles were mothballed, but occasionally used by the Armed Forces to provide fire cover in a number of fire strikes, notably in 1977 and 2002 (see 2002-2003 UK firefighter dispute). They were also deployed to pump water in floods and droughts. They were well maintained in storage, and regularly road tested. There was a less significant strike by firefighters in the Winter of Discontent (late 1978 and early 1979), where once again the Green Goddesses were drafted in to cover; it is largely forgotten by many as it occurred at a time when a significant percentage of public sector workers were on strike.

The role of Green Goddesses was superseded by new contingency arrangements. The Fire and Rescue Services Act 2004 gave the government the power to instruct fire and rescue authorities to make their own vehicles available in the event of future industrial action. New Incident Response Units introduced after the September 11, 2001 attacks offered high-power pumping ability among a range of other contingency functions.

Use in Ireland
35 units were bought by Irish Auxiliary Fire Service and allocated to corporation and county council fire services. 25 were bought new in 1961–1964 and ten more ex-British Government vehicles were bought second hand in 1971. Two more ex-British units were purchased by Dublin Civil Defence in 2005.

Use in Uruguay, South America
One unit has been put into operation due to the forest fires of the Uruguayan southern summer 2023, and works daily on the east coast, specifically in the Volunter Fire Department, in the José Ignacio Spa.
In 2008, the United Kingdom donated for second time, units to the National Directorate of Firefighters of Uruguay to fight Forest Fires.

Disposal

In March 2004, the British Government announced that it was conducting a test sale of forty of its remaining fleet of more than nine hundred vehicles, and that it was planning to dispose of the remainder. The sale of the fleet was completed, and most of the vehicles were sold to fire brigades in developing countries, mostly in Africa. Some were donated to museums, including the prototype which was placed in the Museum of RAF Firefighting. Others are in the National Emergency Services Museum, National Museum of Scotland, Kent Firefighting Museum, Leicester Fire Brigade Museum, Yorkshire Air Museum and Montrose Air Station Heritage Centre. Some were purchased by vehicle restoration trusts and some are privately owned.

Technical specifications

But one advantage that some Green Goddesses enjoyed over most modern fire appliances was their four-wheel drive.

Some were later modified by the installation of flashing blue lamps and two-tone warning sirens, and alterations to the rear lamps, to bring them into line with then current practice on "regular" emergency appliances. Mechanically, they were designed to be robust and easy to maintain. 

The Green Goddess carried a range of equipment from standard hose and branches, through a selection of nozzles to provide different flows and jet patterns, to Light Portable Pumps and Ceiling Arresters. They all carried a  extension ladder, together with at least one scaling ladder. Some carried additional equipment, such as hook ladders, radios, large bolt cutters, etc.

Pumps
Normal fire hoses could be used either from the main pump, which had four outlets, or from normal fire hydrants for which an assortment of connecting branches were carried. In addition, the machines carried a small Coventry Climax  pump, with its own petrol engine, which could also draw water from a river or other source, again feeding normal fire hoses, and which provided a separate and self-contained fire fighting capability. A  water tank ( on 4×4) was installed, which fed small diameter hoses on each side of the vehicle to give an immediate "first aid" capacity to fight a fire while the main hoses were connected and brought into use. A stirrup pump was also carried, together with a full range of other suitable tools and equipment.

Crew
The vehicles were normally crewed by an officer in charge, who sat in the front passenger seat, a driver/pump operator, and four fire fighters seated on the crew bench.
In the mid 1960s, some Territorial artillery regiments were earmarked for a water pumping role, partly because the six man gun crew matched the numbers on the pump units. Training methods and rotation of roles were common factors in gunnery and water pumping.
Artillery regiments undertook a two-week course at Devizes in lieu of their normal annual gunnery training camp.

See also
 Operation Fresco
 Military aid to the civil power

References

External links

 - Film discussing how to maintain a Green Goddess fire engine dating from the period they were in British Service.

Fire service vehicles
Bedford vehicles